Lingo is a populated place in Roosevelt County, New Mexico, United States, located at latitude 33.7884278 and longitude -103.1146674, at 3,986 feet of elevation. The original name given the settlement in 1916 was “Need”, but U.S. postal authorities said that was too much like “Weed” in Otero County, so in 1918 the name was changed to "Lingo".

The community post office was originally located three miles south of the current location on New Mexico State Road 114, seven miles south of Causey and five miles from the Texas border.

An early authority on New Mexico place names states the name was derived from the Southwestern colloquial term "lingo" (from Latin lingua tongue), but a later authority states that the name more likely resulted from a family name.

References

Populated places established in 1918
Unincorporated communities in New Mexico
Unincorporated communities in Roosevelt County, New Mexico